Coming About is a large-ensemble jazz album by composer, arranger, and conductor Maria Schneider and her orchestra that was released in 1996 by Enja Records.

Track listing

Source: AllMusic

Personnel

 Maria Schneider – conductor, producer
 Rocky Ciccarone – trombone
 Larry Farrell – trombone
 Keith O'Quinn – trombone
 George Flynn – bass trombone
 Laurie Frink – flugelhorn, trumpet
 Greg Gisbert – flugelhorn, trumpet
 Tim Hagans – flugelhorn, trumpet
 Tony Kadleck – flugelhorn, trumpet
 Rick Margitza – tenor saxophone
 Rich Perry – tenor saxophone
 Charles Pillow – clarinet, English horn
 Tim Ries – clarinet, flute, alto and soprano saxophones
 Scott Robinson – clarinet, flute, saxophone, theremin
 Mark Vinci – clarinet, flute, alto and soprano saxophones
 Frank Kimbrough – piano
 Ben Monder – guitar
 Tony Scherr – bass guitar, double bass
 Tim Horner – drums
 Matthias Winckelmann – executive producer
 Terry Teachout – liner notes

References

1996 albums
Maria Schneider (musician) albums
Big band albums